HMS Espiegle was a Doterel-class sloop of the Royal Navy, built at the Devonport Dockyard and launched on 3 August 1880.

Design
The Doterel class was designed by Nathaniel Barnaby as a development of William Henry White's 1874 .  The graceful clipper bow of the Ospreys was replaced by a vertical stem and the engines were more powerful. The hull was of composite construction, with wooden planks over an iron frame.

Propulsion

Armament
Ships of the class were armed with two 7-inch (90cwt) muzzle-loading rifled guns on pivoting mounts, and four 64-pounder muzzle-loading rifled guns (two on pivoting mounts, and two broadside). Four machine guns and one light gun completed the weaponry.

Sail plan
All the ships of the class were provided with a barque rig, that is, square-rigged foremast and mainmast, and fore-and-aft sails only on the mizzen mast.

Crew
Espiegle would have had a normal complement of 140–150 men.

Construction
Espiegle was ordered from Devonport Dockyard and laid down on 23 September 1879.  She was launched on 3 August 1880 and was commissioned on 11 October 1881 at Devonport.

Service
She commenced service on the Australia Station in November 1881. She left the Australia Station in March 1885 and went to the China Station. She assisted during the Chilean Revolt in 1891. She was fitted out as a boom defence vessel in 1899 and stationed at Southampton; she was renamed Argo in 1902.

Fate
She was sold to W. Thorpe for breaking on 25 August 1921.

References

Bastock, John (1988), Ships on the Australia Station, Child & Associates Publishing Pty Ltd; Frenchs Forest, Australia. 

 

1880 ships
Doterel-class sloops
Victorian-era sloops of the United Kingdom
Ships built in Plymouth, Devon